The Park City High School Mechanical Arts Building, at 1167 Woodside in Park City, Utah, was built in 1935–36.  It was listed on the National Register of Historic Places in 1996.

It is Moderne in style.

It was built as a Works Project Administration project.

There are currently five mechanical arts buildings listed on the National Register in Utah. The other four are:
Morgan High School Mechanical Arts Building (1936), Morgan, Utah
Moroni High School Mechanical Arts Building (1935-36), Moroni, Utah
Mount Pleasant High School Mechanical Arts Building (1935-36), Mount Pleasant, Utah
Springville High School Mechanical Arts Building (1929), Springville, Utah

References

National Register of Historic Places in Summit County, Utah
Moderne architecture in the United States
Buildings and structures completed in 1935
1935 establishments in Utah